Sitamgar  is a 1985 Bollywood action film starring Dharmendra, Rishi Kapoor, Parveen Babi, Poonam Dhillon.

Cast 
 Dharmendra as Sonu / Shankar
 Rishi Kapoor as Jai
 Parveen Babi as Sheela
 Poonam Dhillon as Nisha
 Prem Chopra as Jeevan
 Dr. Shreeram Lagoo as Nath
 Narendra Nath as Kundan
 Sonia Sahni as Nisha's mother
 Sudhir as Inspector
 Jagdish Raj

Soundtrack
All songs were written by Majrooh Sultanpuri.

External links

1985 films
1980s Hindi-language films
Films scored by R. D. Burman
Films directed by Raj N. Sippy